Shi Haoran (born May 13, 1990 in Wenzhou, Zhejiang) is a Chinese swimmer, who competed for Team China at the 2008 Summer Olympics.

Major achievements
2007 National Intercity Games - 3rd 200 m free

References

http://2008teamchina.olympic.cn/index.php/personview/personsen/5528

1990 births
Living people
Chinese male freestyle swimmers
Olympic swimmers of China
Sportspeople from Wenzhou
Swimmers from Zhejiang
Swimmers at the 2008 Summer Olympics
21st-century Chinese people